Colin O'Malley (born December 9, 1973) is a composer who has worked with CNN, the Walt Disney Company, the United States Air Force, Universal Studios, DC Comics and Electronic Arts.

In addition to his own composition projects he worked as an orchestrator for the recording artist Yanni.

He was the main composer of the Tomb Raider: Underworld video game, and he collaborated with Troels Folmann in making the score.

List of works

Composer

 Woman In Motion (2019) (Documentary) 
Battle for Eire (2018)
Madden NFL 13 (2012) (VG)
NCAA Football 12 (2011) (VG)
NCAA Football 11 (2010) (VG)
Lara Croft and the Guardian of Light (2010) (re-editing tracks from Tomb Raider: Legend, Anniversary, and Underworld, with Troels Brun Folmann)
Letters to God (2010)
Tomb Raider: Underworld (2008) (composer of the bulk with Troels B. Folmann as supervisor)
 Mr. Gnobody (2008)
 Dusk (2007)
 Mr. Bubbs (2007)
 Superman Returns (2006) (VG)
 Once Not Far from Home (2006)
 The Last Reunion: A Gathering of Heroes (2003) (Documentary) 
 Hereditary Misfortune (2003)
 Time & Again (2002)
 Funky Town (2000)
 All Shook Up (1999)
 The Salesman (1999/I)
 Uncommon Friends of the Twentieth Century (1999) (Documentary)

Musical support
Boyz II Men: Under the Streetlight (2017) (Album) (producer) 
The Dream Concert: Live from the Great Pyramids of Egypt (2016) (TV) (orchestrator)
Yanni: Inspirato (2014) (Album) (orchestrator)  
Yanni: Live at El Morro (2012) (TV) (orchestrator)
Disney Parks Christmas Parade Special (2009-2010) (TV) (composer: theme music / musical director)
Walt Disney World Christmas Day Parade (2008) (TV) (musical director)
 Yanni: Voices (2008) (TV) (orchestrator)
 Yanni Live! The Concert Event (2006) (TV) (orchestrator)
 Revenge of the Mummy: The Ride (2004) (composer: additional music)

Notes

External links
Official website

Video game composers
American male composers
1973 births
Living people